Las Ollas Arriba is a corregimiento in Capira District, Panamá Oeste Province, Panama with a population of 1,201 as of 2010. Its population as of 1990 was 803; its population as of 2000 was 952.

References

Corregimientos of Panamá Oeste Province